The Copa de Nicaragua is the top knockout tournament in Nicaragua association football. It is held for clubs in the domestic leagues annually.

Winners
1983 : Deportivo Masaya
1984 : FC San Marcos
1991 : Real Estelí
1995 : FC San Marcos
1996 : Diriangén FC       bt   Real Estelí
1997 : Diriangén FC       5-0 Deportivo Walter Ferretti
2005 : Deportivo Masatepe        2-0 América Managua
2019 : Managua F.C. 0-0, 0-0 (aet, pen 4-3)  Diriangén FC
2020 : Diriangén FC 1-0 Managua F.C.
2021 : Deportivo Walter Ferretti 3-1 Real Madriz FC
2022 : Deportivo Walter Ferretti - Real Estelí Final not played yet

References

External links
Nicaragua - List of Cup Winners, RSSSF.com
Copa Nicaragua, Soccerway

Football competitions in Nicaragua
National association football cups